Louis Marie Lucien Henri Alphonse "Loek" Hermans (born 23 April 1951) is a retired Dutch politician of the People's Party for Freedom and Democracy (VVD) and businessman.

Biography
Hermans attended a Gymnasium in Kerkrade from April 1964 until May 1970 and applied at the Radboud University Nijmegen in June 1970 majoring in Public administration obtaining an Bachelor of Public Administration degree in July 1972 before graduating with an Master of Public Administration degree in July 1976. Hermans worked as a civics teacher in Arnhem from August 1972 until July 1976. Hermans served on the Municipal Council of Nijmegen from 3 September 1974 until 5 September 1978.

Hermans was elected as a Member of the House of Representatives after the election of 1977, taking office on 8 June 1977 serving as a frontbencher and spokesperson for Civil service and Public administration. In September 1990 Hermans was nominated as Mayor of Zwolle, he was installed as Mayor on 16 September 1990 and resigned as a Member of the House of Representatives on 24 September 1990. In April 1994 Hermans was nominated as the next Queen's Commissioner of Friesland, he resigned as Mayor the same day he was installed as Queen's Commissioner, taking office on 25 April 1994. After the election of 1998 Hermans was appointed as Minister of Education, Culture and Science in the Cabinet Kok II, taking office on 3 August 1998. The Cabinet Kok II resigned on 16 April 2002 following the conclusions of the NIOD report into the Srebrenica massacre during the Bosnian War and continued to serve in a demissionary capacity. After the election of 2002 Hermans returned as a Member of the House of Representatives, taking office on 23 May 2002. Following the cabinet formation of 2002 Hermans was not giving a cabinet post in the new cabinet, the Cabinet Kok II was replaced by the Cabinet Balkenende I on 22 July 2002 and he continued to serve in the House of Representatives until his resignation on 22 July 2002.

Hermans semi-retired from national politics and became active in the private sector and public sector and occupied numerous seats as a corporate director and nonprofit director on several boards of directors and supervisory boards (Vestia, Public Pension Funds PFZW, Heeren Zeventien Friesland association and CARE) and served on several state commissions and councils on behalf of the government (Central Asylum Seekers Authority, Probation Agency, National Archives and the Social and Economic Council). Hermans also worked as a trade association executive for the Entrepreneurs association serving as Chairman of the Executive Board from 1 July 2003 until 9 February 2011 and for the Publishers association serving as Chairman of the Executive Board from 10 December 2002 until 1 November 2012. Hermans also worked as media administrator for the public broadcaster WNL serving as Chairman of the Supervisory board from 16 February 2009 until 15 April 2013 and as a sport administrator for SC Heerenveen and as a academic administrator for the Radboud University Nijmegen serving as Chairman of the Education board since 1 May 2008. Hermans was elected as a Member of the Senate after the Senate election of 2007, taking office on 12 June 2007 serving as a frontbencher chairing the parliamentary committee for the Interior and the parliamentary committee for Constitutional Affairs and spokesperson for Royal House affairs. Hermans was selected as Parliamentary leader of the People's Party for Freedom and Democracy in the Senate following the appointment of Uri Rosenthal as Minister of Foreign Affairs in the Cabinet Rutte I, taking office on 22 February 2011. On 3 November 2015 Hermans resigned after a judicial verdict of mismanagement at Meavita, a health care organisation where Hermans served as Chairman of the Supervisory board when the organisation went bankrupt in 2009.

Decorations

References

External links

Official
  Drs. L.M.L.H.A. (Loek) Hermans Parlement & Politiek
  Drs. L.M.L.H.A. Hermans (VVD) Eerste Kamer der Staten-Generaal

 

 

 

 

 

 

 

 

1951 births
Living people
Dutch academic administrators
Dutch chief executives in the media industry
Dutch chief executives in the healthcare industry
Dutch corporate directors
Dutch nonprofit directors
Dutch nonprofit executives
Dutch public broadcasting administrators
Dutch trade association executives
Dutch lobbyists
Dutch sports executives and administrators
Dutch Roman Catholics
Grand Officers of the Order of Leopold II
King's and Queen's Commissioners of Friesland
Knights Commander of the Order of Merit of the Federal Republic of Germany
Knights of the Holy Sepulchre
Knights of the Order of the Netherlands Lion
Mayors of Zwolle
Members of the House of Representatives (Netherlands)
Members of the Senate (Netherlands)
Members of the Social and Economic Council
Ministers of Education of the Netherlands
Municipal councillors of Nijmegen
Officers of the Order of Orange-Nassau
People from Heerlen
People from Nijmegen
People from Opsterland
People's Party for Freedom and Democracy politicians
Radboud University Nijmegen alumni
Academic staff of Radboud University Nijmegen
20th-century Dutch businesspeople
20th-century Dutch civil servants
20th-century Dutch educators
20th-century Dutch politicians
21st-century Dutch businesspeople
21st-century Dutch civil servants
21st-century Dutch educators
21st-century Dutch politicians